Wyatt Outlaw (1820February 26, 1870) was an American politician and the first African-American to serve as Town Commissioner and Constable of the town of Graham, North Carolina. He was lynched by the White Brotherhood, a branch of the Ku Klux Klan on February 26, 1870. His death, along with the assassination of white Republican State Senator John W. Stephens at the Caswell County Courthouse, provoked Governor William Woods Holden to declare martial law in Alamance and Caswell Counties, resulting in the Kirk-Holden War of 1870.

Biography 
Outlaw was apparently of mixed racial heritage.  He was mentioned in a letter as being the son of a white Alamance County slave-owner Chesley F. Faucett. One source suggests he lived on the tobacco farm of Nancy Outlaw on Jordan Creek, northeast of Graham, North Carolina. Sources conflict on the question of whether Outlaw was born a slave or a free person of color.

Outlaw is probably the same person enlisted as "Wright Outlaw" in the 2nd Regiment U. S. Colored Cavalry in 1863 who fought in various engagements in Virginia and was later stationed on the Rio Grande in Texas until mustered out in February 1866.

Outlaw, whose trade was woodworking and cabinet-making, was an African-American community leader in Alamance County. In 1866 he founded or cofounded the Loyal Republican League in Alamance. In 1868, Outlaw was among a number of trustees who were deeded land for the establishment of the first African Methodist Episcopal Church in Alamance County.  Outlaw's Loyal Republican League was later incorporated into the Union League, a fraternal order connected to the Republican Party.

Outlaw's prominent activities on behalf of African Americans in Alamance County made him a target of the White Brotherhood and the Constitutional Union Guard, both local branches of the Ku Klux Klan. As a prominent Republican in Alamance County, Outlaw was appointed to the Graham Town Council by Governor Holden and soon became one of three constables of the town – all three of whom were African Americans. On one occasion in 1869, white residents of the area who were incensed by the prospect of being policed by an all African-American constabulary organized a nighttime ride in Klan garb through the streets of Graham in an effort to frighten the African-American constables. Outlaw and another constable opened fire on the night riders, but no injuries were sustained.

Outlaw's aggressive response to the night riders may have inflamed the anger of Klan sympathizers. Outlaw's body bore on the chest a message from the perpetrators: "Beware, ye guilty, both black and white."

A local African-American man named Puryear claimed to know who was responsible for the lynching, but Puryear was soon found dead in a nearby pond.

In 1873, Guilford County Superior Court Judge Albion Tourgee advocated for re-visiting the murder of Wyatt Outlaw. That year the Grand Jury of Alamance County brought felony indictments against 63 Klansmen, including 18 murder counts, in connection with the lynching of Wyatt Outlaw. Among those were James Bradshaw, Jesse Thompson, Michael Michael Thompson Teer, Geo. Mebane, Henry Robison, George Rogers, John S. Dixon, Walter Thornton, David Johnson, Curry Johnson, James Johnson, Thomas Tate, and Van Buren Holt. However, the Democratic-controlled state legislature repealed the laws under which most of these indictments had been brought, so the charges were dropped. No one was ever tried in connection with Outlaw's murder.

Notes

1820 births
1870 deaths
1870 murders in the United States
African-American politicians during the Reconstruction Era
Activists for African-American civil rights
Victims of the Ku Klux Klan
Murdered African-American people
Racially motivated violence against African Americans
People murdered in North Carolina
Lynching deaths in North Carolina
People from Graham, North Carolina
North Carolina Republicans
African Americans in the American Civil War
Union Army soldiers
People of North Carolina in the American Civil War
Ku Klux Klan in North Carolina